Edward Brown may refer to:

Government and politics
 Ed Brown (Texas politician) (fl. 1874), Texas state senator
 Edward Brown (barrister) (born 1958), Senior Treasury Counsel
 Edward Brown (Manitoba politician) (1865–1947), leader of the Manitoba Liberal Party
 Edward Brown (British politician) (1913–1991), Member of Parliament for Bath
 Edward Brown (American lawyer) (c. 1790–1860), South Carolina lawyer and proslavery writer
 Edward George Brown (1829–1895), New South Wales colonial politician
 Edward L. Brown (1805–1876), physician and political figure in the Nova Scotia House of Assembly
 L. Edward Brown (born 1937), mayor of Pocatello, Idaho, member of the Idaho House of Representatives, and a leader in the LDS Church

Sports
 Ed Brown (baseball), 19th-century American baseball player
 Ed Brown (end) (born ), American football end
 Ed Brown (quarterback) (1928–2007), American football quarterback
 Edward Brown (cricketer, born 1837) (1837–1900), Australian cricketer
 Edward Brown (cricketer, born 1891) (1891–1949), Australian cricketer
 Edward Brown (footballer) (1881–1904 or later), English footballer
 Edward D. Brown (1850–1906), African American jockey
 Ed Brown (racing driver) (born 1963), American racing driver

Other
 Edward Espe Brown (born 1945), American Zen teacher and author
 Edward and Elaine Brown (born 1942), American tax protesters
 Ed Brown (died 1978), of the Copp and Brown children's record series
 Edward Douglas Brown (1861–1940), recipient of the Victoria Cross
 Edward Eagle Brown (1885–1959), American attorney and businessman
 Edward Brown Jr. (1841–1911), Irish soldier who fought in the American Civil War
Edward J. Brown (1909–1991), American literary scholar

See also
 Edward Browne (disambiguation)
 Eddie Brown (disambiguation)
 Ted Brown (disambiguation)
 Edwin Brown (1898–1972), Australian rugby league footballer
 Edwin Brown (naturalist) (died 1876), English naturalist and entomologist